Garies is a small agricultural centre situated in South Africa's Northern Cape province about 110 km south of Springbok, the chief town of the Namaqualand district. Current population approximately 1500.

The Letterklip  provincial heritage site is situated just west of town.

The town is in the Namaqualand district, at the foot of the Kamiesberg, 46 km south of Kamieskroon and 146 km northwest of Vanrhynsdorp. The name is Khoekhoen and means ‘couchgrass’, Afrikaans ‘kweek’.

References

Populated places in the Kamiesberg Local Municipality
1845 establishments in the Cape Colony